Christopher Columbus Bowen (January 5, 1832 – June 23, 1880) was a U.S. Representative from South Carolina.

Early life
Born in Providence, Rhode Island in 1832, Bowen attended the public schools. He moved to Georgia in 1850 as a young man, as good lands were available. There he engaged in agricultural pursuits and then studied law.

He was admitted to the bar in 1862 and commenced practice in Charleston, South Carolina. During the Civil War he enlisted in the Confederate States Army and served throughout the war as a captain in the Coast Guard. After the war, he resumed the practice of law in Charleston.

Political career
Bowen served as a member of the Republican State convention at Charleston in May 1867. He then served as the first chairman of the South Carolina Republican State central committee. He served as delegate to the State constitutional convention in November 1867.

Upon the readmission of South Carolina to the Union in 1868, he was elected as a Republican to the Fortieth and Forty-first Congresses and served from July 20, 1868, to March 3, 1871.

He was an unsuccessful candidate for reelection in 1870 to the Forty-second Congress, being defeated by Robert De Large, also a Republican. He challenged the victory by De Large, but the Election Committee took a long time to rule in the case. He served as a member of  The South Carolina House of Representatives from 1871 to 1872, and was elected sheriff of Charleston in November 1872.

The Election Committee declared that there were so many irregularities in the 1870 election that they could not declare a victor and demanded the congressional seat be made vacant in 1873.

Bowen died in New York City, June 23, 1880. He was interred in St. Laurence Cemetery, Charleston, South Carolina.

Sources

External links
 

1832 births
1880 deaths
People from Providence, Rhode Island
American people of Welsh descent
Republican Party members of the United States House of Representatives from South Carolina
19th-century American politicians
Confederate States Army personnel